Aminu Ado Bayero ,  (born 10 February 1961) is the 15th Fulani Emir of Kano from the Fulani Sullubawa clan. He ascended the throne on 9 March 2020, following the deposition of his nephew Muhammad Sanusi II by Governor Dr. Abdullahi Umar Ganduje. He is the chancellor of the University of Calabar.

Early life

Family 
Aminu Ado Bayero was born on 10 February 1961. His father, Ado Bayero, was the Emir of Kano from 1963 to 2014 and the longest serving emir in the history of Kano. He is the second eldest son of his father. His siblings include his eldest brother Sanusi Ado Bayero, and Nasiru Ado Bayero the Emir of Bichi. His father's grandnephew, Muhammadu Sanusi II succeeded his father as Emir of Kano from 2014 until 2020 when he was dethroned by the Kano State government.

Education 
Aminu received early Islamic education at home, where he learnt the Qur'an, Polythem, Islamic jurisprudence and the traditions of the Prophet Muhammad. He attended Kofar Kudu Primary School and proceeded to Government College, Birnin Kudu. He studied mass communication at the Bayero University Kano and went to Flying College, Oakland, California, US. He did his one-year mandatory National Youth Service Corps at the Nigeria Television Authority in Makurdi.

Early career 
Bayero worked as a public relations officer at Kabo Air, before becoming a flight engineer.

Titles and engagement 
In 1990, he was appointed Dan Majen Kano and district head of Dala by his father, Ado Bayero, before being promoted to Dan Buram Kano in October of the same year. In 1992, he was promoted to Turakin Kano and to Sarkin Dawakin Tsakar Gida Kano in 2000. He also served as the chairman of the Kano emirate durbar committee. In 2014, the then emir of Kano, Muhammad Sanusi II, promoted him to Wamban Kano, thereby, transferring him from Dala to Kano municipal where he succeeded Galadiman Kano, Alhaji Tijani Hashim as the district head. In 2019, he was appointed emir of Bichi by the governor of Kano State, Abdullahi Umar Ganduje.

In October 2022, a Nigerian national honour of Commander of the Order of the Federal Republic (CFR) was conferred on him by President Muhammadu Buhari.

Emir of Kano

Accession 
He ascended the throne on 9 March 2020, following the deposition of his nephew  Muhammad Sanusi II by the Governor of Kano state, Abdullahi Umar Ganduje. Governor Abdullahi Ganduje of Kano State on Saturday 3 July 2021 presented staff of office to the 15th Emir of Kano, Aminu Ado Bayero.

References

1961 births
Living people
Bayero University Kano alumni
Emirs of Kano
Nigerian Fula people
Nigerian Muslims
Nigerian traditional rulers